Tepeu is a word of the Kʼicheʼ Maya language meaning "sovereign" (also "one who conquers" or "one who is victorious"). The title is associated with the god Qʼuqʼumatz of the Kʼicheʼ-Maya, one of the creation gods of the Popol Vuh; his whole name translating as "Sovereign Plumed Serpent". The title has also been used by numerous Kʼicheʼ rulers such as Tepepul.

The word originated from the Nahuatl Tepeuh.

References

Maya civilization
K'iche'